The 2002 Europe Music Awards were held at Palau Sant Jordi, Barcelona.

Performances included a rendition of "Dirrty" from Christina Aguilera featuring Redman as they performed in a boxing ring with Christina sporting leather chaps. Whitney Houston, Pink, Bon Jovi and Foo Fighters each performed as did Coldplay and Eminem, both making their EMA debut.

Winners on the night included Jennifer Lopez, taking Best Female for the second year running.

Kylie Minogue, Pamela Anderson, Sophie Ellis-Bextor, Jade Jagger, Pierce Brosnan. Anastacia, Rachel Roberts, and Melanie C presented awards.

Nominations
Winners are in bold text.

Regional nominations
Winners are in bold text.

Performances

Pre show
t.A.T.u. — "All the Things She Said"

Main show
Röyksopp — "Remind Me / Poor Leno"
Pink — "Get the Party Started / Don't Let Me Get Me / Just Like a Pill"
Eminem — "Cleanin' Out My Closet / Lose Yourself"
Foo Fighters — "All My Life"
Christina Aguilera (featuring Redman) — "Dirrty"
Whitney Houston — "Whatchulookinat"
Bon Jovi — "Everyday"
Enrique Iglesias — "Maybe / Love to See You Cry"
Coldplay — "In My Place"
Robbie Williams — "Feel"
Wyclef Jean (featuring City High and Loon) — "Pussycat"
Moby — "In My Heart / Bodyrock"

Appearances 
 Pamela Anderson and Wyclef Jean — presented Best Group
 Jade Jagger and Pharrell Williams — presented Best R&B
 Sophie Ellis-Bextor and Holly Valance — presented Best Pop
 Pierce Brosnan — presented Best Male
 Ronan Keating and Esther Cañadas — presented Best Live Act
 Nick Carter and Rachel Roberts — presented Web Award
 Dolce & Gabbana and Sara Montiel — presented Best Female
 Moby and Ms. Dynamite — presented Best New Act
 Anastacia and Melanie C — presented Best Song
 Kylie Minogue — presented Best Hard Rock
 t.A.T.u. and The Calling— presented Best Dance
 Marilyn Manson and Kelis — presented Best Hip-Hop
 Patrick Kluivert — presented Free Your Mind
 Las Ketchup and Tiziano Ferro — presented Best Rock
 Sugababes and Patrick Kluivert — presented Best Album
 Jean Paul Gaultier and Rupert Everett — presented Best Video

See also
2002 MTV Video Music Awards

External links
Nominees

2002 music awards
2002
2002 in Catalonia
2000s in Barcelona
2002 in Spanish music
November 2002 events in Europe